The Haifa bus 16 suicide bombing was a suicide bombing which occurred on 2 December 2001 on an Egged bus in Haifa. 15 people were killed in the attack and 40 people were injured.

The Palestinian Islamist militant organization Hamas claimed responsibility for the attack.

The attack 
During the afternoon of Sunday, 2 December 2001, the perpetrator calmly boarded Haifa bus No. 16, which was en route from Neve Sha'anan to the Giborim bridge. The perpetrator paid the bus fare and a few seconds later detonated the explosive device concealed underneath his clothes. The attack, which occurred in a busy intersection in the Tel Amal neighbourhood in Haifa killed 15 people and injured 40 more, 17 of them critically.

The perpetrators 
Hamas claimed responsibility for the attack. A leaflet published by the Hamas announced that the suicide bomber was Maher Habashi, a 21-year-old Palestinian plumber from Nablus.

References

External links 
 15 SLAUGHTERED IN 3RD SUICIDE ATTACK Israel left reeling by bus bombing - 3 December 2001. Daily News

Mass murder in 2001
Suicide bombings in 2001
Terrorist incidents in Israel in 2001
Terrorist incidents in Haifa
December 2001 events in Asia
Hamas suicide bombings of buses
Islamic terrorist incidents in 2001
Islamic terrorism in Israel